The women's 3000 metres walk event  at the 1987 European Athletics Indoor Championships was held on 22 February. It was the first time that women's racewalking was contested at the European Indoor Championships.

Results

References

Racewalking at the European Athletics Indoor Championships
3000
Euro